Best of Indie Years is the second compilation album by L'Âme Immortelle.

Track listing 

 "Lieder die wie Wunden bluten"
 "Winter of my Soul"
 "Silver Rain"
 "Will You?"
 "Love is Lost"
 "Resurrection"
 "In the Heart of Europe (original version)"
 "Redemption"
 "Scheideweg"
 "Ich gab dir alles"
 "Another Day"
 "Epitaph"
 "Leaving"
 "Betrayal"
 "Letting Go"

2008 greatest hits albums
L'Âme Immortelle albums